Windlan Edsel Hall (born March 11, 1950) is a former American football cornerback in the NFL. He played for the San Francisco 49ers, the Minnesota Vikings, and the Washington Redskins.  He played college football at Arizona State University and was drafted in the fourth round of the 1972 NFL Draft. He played high school football at Gardena High School

References

1950 births
Living people
American football cornerbacks
Arizona State Sun Devils football players
Minnesota Vikings players
Players of American football from Los Angeles
San Francisco 49ers players
Washington Redskins players